Wierzbna may refer to the following places in Poland:
 Wierzbna, Lower Silesian Voivodeship (south-west Poland)
 Wierzbna, Subcarpathian Voivodeship (south-east Poland)
 Wierzbna, Opole Voivodeship (south-west Poland)